The Brig o' Balgownie is a 13th-century bridge spanning the River Don in Old Aberdeen, Aberdeen, Scotland.

Construction of the bridge was begun in the late 13th century by Richard Cementarius, although its completion was not until 1320 at the time of the Scottish War of Independence. After falling into disrepair in the mid 16th century it was extensively renovated in 1605.

Throughout its history the bridge has been considered an important asset. For five centuries possession of the bridge was the only way to move large armies quickly along the eastern coast of Aberdeenshire. It also provided a trade route to the wealthy areas of the north-east of Scotland.

The bridge is constructed of granite and sandstone.

History
The text below is taken from the notes of a public talk History of the Brig o'Balgownie given by Dr. Christopher P. Croly from the Archaeological Unit at Aberdeen City Council.

Origin of the bridge's name
The name "Balgownie" comes from the surrounding area, Balgownie, which from an early time was a barony. The name itself has a Gaelic origin, but is a source of some debate. Some authorities believe that the first part of the name derives from Baile and means "town". However the very earliest references to the barony, or settlement, of Balgownie invariably have the word as Palgoueny, or Polgowny, or a number of minor variants, generally starting with Pol. Pol relates to a pool, probably the one known as the "black neuk". However it may be that P and B are interchangeable and the distinction may not affect the meaning. There are two possible suggestions for the second part, some say that gabhainn, genitive of gabhann, means a "of a cattle-fold" whilst others have asserted that it derives from gobhainn which indicates a blacksmith, or just a smith.

The first recorded instance of the name of Polgowny dates from 1256, but it is in all likelihood older.

Who built the bridge
The familiar story is that the stone bridge was commissioned by either Bishop Henry Cheyne or Robert the Bruce, or indeed was begun by the former and completed by the latter, and that the work was done by Richard Cementarius. It is said that Cheyne started the work but fled Bruce's troops, and then Bruce finished the work later on. However, the earliest written version of the origins of the bridge is slightly at odds with later ones. The first written history of the bridge was by Sir Alexander Hay, in a charter of 1605. In the charter he wrote that the bridge "was built by command, and at the expense of, the deceased most invincible prince, Robert Bruce, king of the Kingdom of Scotland." This account only contains one element of what becomes a fairly consistent story. Parson Gordon was the first to record a fuller version of the story some sixty years after Hay. He wrote: "No man can certainly tell who builded the Bridge of Done. The commone and most probable reporte is that the renouned Prince Robert Bruisse, King of Scotland, at such tyme as he banished B. Henrie Cheyne from his sea, and drave him out of Scotland beside, did command for to sequester the bishops yeerlie revenue to be imployed towards pious uses, and that this bridge (which is lyke to be true) was builted with a part of that revenue."

Thus the two earliest versions of this story both put the onus for building the bridge on Robert the Bruce, and neither mention involvement by Bishop Cheyne. This story has been repeated a number of times over the centuries often with only minor changes. In 1780 Francis Douglas wrote that it "is said to have been built by Henry Cheyne, bishop of Aberdeen, about the year 1290, or by King Robert the Bruce, who perhaps completed what the bishop had begun." In the 19th century Camden wrote that "it was projected by Bishop Henry Cheyne … and built at his expense". In the 20th century Alexander Keith tells all elements of the story: that it was started by Bruce or Cheyne, but certainly completed by the former. He favours the Bruce version citing Hay and Boece as his evidence. The story about the involvement of Cementarius is an entirely new one, and seems to be no older than the 20th century. It was perhaps first stated by W. Douglas Simpson.

Richard Cementarius is often cited as the first Provost of Aberdeen, or rather the first Alderman. However, that can not be correct: what would be correct would be to say that he is the first person whose name has been connected with that office in some official document, and that therefore he is the first recorded Provost of Aberdeen. However that does not seem to be true either. Certainly Richard is an historical figure: there is a contemporary reference to Richard in the Exchequer Rolls return for Aberdeen of 1264 which refers to "Magistro Ri. Cementario" in the context of work being carried out of Aberdeen Castle. What is important is that he is not specifically described as "provost". Other documents about him all refer to him as a burgess of the Burgh, but never as provost. Moreover, he seems to have been dead by 1294. In that year Malcolm of Palogoueny and Duncan the merchant, both described as burgesses, wrote a charter in which they acted as guarantors of the estate of the late Richard, also described as burgess. He had left monies and annual rents to the altar of St John the Apostle in the Church of St Nicholas. The altar itself he seems to have founded in 1277. So from these it is probable that he was alive in 1277 but dead by 1294, therefore any involvement that he had with building the bridge would have to have been before 1294. As we do not know when the bridge was built it is unclear if he could have been involved. But it is a modern story whose only real prop is the similarity between the arch in the bridge and an arch in Drum Castle, also ascribed to Cementarius, but not proved and that certainly needs more research. However, it may simply have reflected a common building style.

Footnotes

   See also, 
  For example, see  where the place name Pitgersie (meaning shoe maker's place) can also be expressed as Balgerscho (or a number of minor variants) where the first part of the name differs it does not affect the meaning of the name. However, Alexander also notes (p.xlvii) that Pit often refers to a town in the same sense as Bal, so it is possible that Pol was a different element with a different meaning.
   gives 'town of the cattlefold'.
  
  In the ecclesiastical statutes of St Machar's issued in 1256 the rights of the salmon fishing at Palgoueny were given to the deacon of the Cathedral, 
  
  
  
   Camden goes on to note that the story is in all likelihood false and he favours the Bruce version, as he relies on Hay's charter as evidence.
   Keith quotes the following from Boerce, 'out of joy that he was received into the King's favour, upon his return home, he applied all the rents of his see, which during his absence had accresced to a considerable sum, towards building the stately bridge over the River Don'. Curiously in the 20th Century the 1320s seem to have taken precedence over the 1280s as having been when the bridge was built, see  who gives the date 1329 without footnote.
  
  The first time this was given was in

External links

Listed bridges in Scotland
Buildings and structures completed in 1320
Category A listed buildings in Aberdeen
Bridges completed in the 14th century
Bridges in Aberdeen
1320s establishments in Scotland